Ravi "Rags" Khote is a playback singer for films in India, he is known for his raps between stanzas. Some of his songs include "Style" from Sivaji: The Boss, "Rabba Rabba" from Allah Ke Banday, and "Pretty Woman" from Kal Ho Naa Ho.

References 

Indian male playback singers
Tamil playback singers
Telugu playback singers
Year of birth missing (living people)
Living people